Sekai no Owari is a Japanese rock band.

 means "end of the world" in Japanese, may also refer to:

 "Sekai no Owari", a 1996 album by Thee Michelle Gun Elephant
 "Sekai no Owari", a 2003 TV episode of .hack//Legend of the Twilight
 "Sekai no Owari", a 2004 TV episode of Pluster World
 "Sekai no Owari", a 2009 TV episode of Drifting Net Cafe
 "Sekai no Owari", a 2009 TV episode of Clannad
 "Sekai no Owari", a 2002 song my Mucc from the album Hōmura Uta
 "Sekai no Owari", a 2011 song by Ken the 390
 "Sekai no Owari ni", a song by Kokia from Akiko Infinity Kokia: Balance

See also
 End of the world (disambiguation)